Soeraedi Tahsin (died February 25, 2003 in Amsterdam), also known as Eddie Soeraedi, was an Indonesian journalist and diplomat. He was the founding editor of the publication Berita Indonesia ('Indonesian News'), the first republican newspaper in Batavia.

Biography 
Tahsin served as the editor-in-chief of Bintang Timur, the daily newspaper of the Indonesian Party (Partindo). As of 1958 he was the general secretary of the Union of Indonesian Journalists (PWI).

In 1964 he was named as ambassador of Indonesia to Mali by president Sukarno. After the military takeover in 1965 and the massacres of 1965-66, S. Tahsin did not return to Indonesia. Instead he went into exile in China. The Indonesian government withdrew his citizenship soon after the coup, leaving him stranded in Beijing. In February 1970 Imris Idris was named as the new Indonesian ambassador to Mali as replacement of Tahsin.

He later moved to the Netherlands, entering the country illegally in 1977. He taught Indonesian language at the Volksuniversiteit and started a publishing/bookstore in Amsterdam 1981, named Manus Amici. E.S.Tahsin died in Amsterdam in 2003.

References

Indonesian journalists
Ambassadors of Indonesia to Mali
Indonesian exiles
2003 deaths
Year of birth missing